Ronald Charles George McCann (25 June 1913 – 15 February 1996) was an Australian rules footballer who played with Collingwood in the Victorian Football League (VFL).

He served with the Australian military in Dutch New Guinea during World War II

References

External links 

		
Ron McCann's profile at Collingwood Forever

1913 births
1996 deaths
Australian rules footballers from Melbourne
Collingwood Football Club players
Castlemaine Football Club players
Royal Australian Air Force personnel of World War II
People from Thornbury, Victoria
Military personnel from Melbourne